Zach Kirkhorn (born 1984) is a financial executive working in the automotive manufacturing industry. Since 2019, he has served as the chief financial officer of Tesla, Inc. In March 2021 he was given the title 'Master of Coin' within Tesla, a reference to the Game of Thrones title for a chief financial officer.

Education
From 2002 to 2006, Kirkhorn studied both Economics at The Wharton School and Mechanical Engineering and Applied Mechanics at the University of Pennsylvania as part of the Jerome Fisher Program in Management and Technology. In 2013, he received an MBA from Harvard Business School.

Career
During his studies in 2005, Kirkhorn joined Microsoft as a financial analyst intern. In 2006, he did another four-month internship at Microsoft as program manager intern. After graduating in 2006, Kirkhorn spent nearly three years working at McKinsey & Company as a senior business analyst.

In 2010, Kirkhorn joined Tesla as a senior analyst in finance. In December 2014, he became director of finance, and in December 2018 he was appointed as vice president of finance. On January 30, 2019, Kirkhorn was announced to replace Deepak Ahuja as Tesla's new CFO on the fourth-quarter Tesla earnings call.

References

Living people
Tesla, Inc. people
Wharton School of the University of Pennsylvania alumni
Harvard Business School alumni
University of Pennsylvania School of Engineering and Applied Science alumni
American chief financial officers
1984 births